Mutts is a Canadian short documentary film, directed by Halima Ouardiri and released in 2019. The film is a portrait of a sanctuary for stray dogs in Morocco.

The film premiered on November 17, 2019, at the Montreal International Documentary Festival. It was subsequently screened at the 2020 Berlin Film Festival, where it won the Crystal Bear for best short film in the Generation 14plus section and the Special Prize of the Generation 14Plus International Jury, and at the 2020 Festival International du Film Francophone de Namur, where it won the jury prize.

It received a Canadian Screen Award nomination for Best Short Documentary at the 9th Canadian Screen Awards, and a Prix Iris nomination for Best Short Documentary at the 23rd Quebec Cinema Awards.

References

External links

2019 films
2019 short documentary films
Canadian short documentary films
2010s Arabic-language films
Arabic-language Canadian films
2010s Canadian films